Jean-Édouard Berthoud (11 December 1846 – 21 June 1916), commonly referred to as Jean Berthoud, was born in Neuchâtel and was married to Georgine Léonie Panier. He was the son of pastoral theology professor Alexis-Henri Berthoud and Louise-Marie Vaucher. He was the father of Henri Berthoud and grandfather of Denise and Raymonde Berthoud.

Berthoud studied law in Neuchâtel. In 1874, he opened a law office in Môtiers which he kept until 1880.

Political and judicial career
 1874      : Conseiller général of Neuchâtel
 1874-1877 : Congressman
 1874-1880 : Sat at the court of appeals
 1883-1889 : Member of the Council of States
 1883-1896 : Assizes court of Neuchâtel and Neuchâtel court President
 1889-1896 : Congressman
 1896-1908 : Member of the Conseil d'Etat (Department of Justice) and member of the Council of States

References

External links 
 http://www.hls-dhs-dss.ch/textes/f/F4418.php

1846 births
1916 deaths
19th-century Swiss lawyers